Cargill Russia is a branch of Cargill that manufactures and markets food products such as oilseeds, poultry, syrups, wheat, starches, specialty food ingredients, and animal feed. The company is also active in the trading of oilseeds and grains. Cargill Russia presently has around 2,500 employees in Russia. The company opened its first office in Moscow in 1991. In December 2005, the company had 1,306 employees, with over 99 percent of employees being Russian nationals.

See also
 List of companies of Russia

Notes

References

Further reading
 
 Lander, Chris; Pallot, Judith (2014). "The Role of International Agro-Food Corporations in the Re-emergence of Russian Agriculture: a Case Study of Cargill Russia. International Institute of Social Studies. 23 pages.
 "Cargill Russia wheat ship to Egypt delayed: traders". June 9, 2010. Daily News Egypt – via Reuters.

External links
 

Food and drink companies based in Moscow
Manufacturing companies based in Moscow